Avinashipalayam (Avināsipāḷaiyam) is a small town in Tiruppur District in Tamil Nadu, India. It comes under Pongalur block and Tiruppur South taluk. It is located 7 km from Pongalur, 19 km from Kangeyam, 22 km away from Tiruppur and 32 km from Dharapuram. It is located along the junction of the Coimbatore - Trichy highway and Tiruppur - Dharapuram highway. The village is home to famous temples including the Bhagavathyamman, Chellandiamman and Mariamman Temples.

References 

Villages in Tiruppur district